The arrondissement of Agen is an arrondissement of France in the Lot-et-Garonne department in the Nouvelle-Aquitaine region. It has 71 communes.

Composition

The communes of the arrondissement of Agen, and their INSEE codes, are:
 
 Agen (47001)
 Aiguillon (47004)
 Astaffort (47015)
 Aubiac (47016)
 Bajamont (47019)
 Bazens (47022)
 Beauville (47025)
 Blaymont (47030)
 Boé (47031)
 Bon-Encontre (47032)
 Bourran (47038)
 Brax (47040)
 Cassignas (47050)
 Castelculier (47051)
 Castella (47053)
 Caudecoste (47060)
 Cauzac (47062)
 Clermont-Dessous (47066)
 Clermont-Soubiran (47067)
 Colayrac-Saint-Cirq (47069)
 Cours (47073)
 La Croix-Blanche (47075)
 Cuq (47076)
 Dondas (47082)
 Engayrac (47087)
 Estillac (47091)
 Fals (47092)
 Foulayronnes (47100)
 Frégimont (47104)
 Galapian (47107)
 Granges-sur-Lot (47111)
 Grayssas (47113)
 Lacépède (47125)
 Lafox (47128)
 Lagarrigue (47129)
 Laplume (47137)
 Laroque-Timbaut (47138)
 Laugnac (47140)
 Layrac (47145)
 Lusignan-Petit (47154)
 Madaillan (47155)
 Marmont-Pachas (47158)
 Moirax (47169)
 Monbalen (47171)
 Montpezat (47190)
 Nicole (47196)
 Le Passage (47201)
 Pont-du-Casse (47209)
 Port-Sainte-Marie (47210)
 Prayssas (47213)
 Puymirol (47217)
 Roquefort (47225)
 Saint-Caprais-de-Lerm (47234)
 Sainte-Colombe-en-Bruilhois (47238)
 Saint-Hilaire-de-Lusignan (47246)
 Saint-Jean-de-Thurac (47248)
 Saint-Martin-de-Beauville (47255)
 Saint-Maurin (47260)
 Saint-Nicolas-de-la-Balerme (47262)
 Saint-Pierre-de-Clairac (47269)
 Saint-Robert (47273)
 Saint-Romain-le-Noble (47274)
 Saint-Salvy (47275)
 Saint-Sardos (47276)
 Saint-Sixte (47279)
 Saint-Urcisse (47281)
 Sauvagnas (47288)
 La Sauvetat-de-Savères (47289)
 Sauveterre-Saint-Denis (47293)
 Sérignac-sur-Garonne (47300)
 Tayrac (47305)

History

The arrondissement of Agen was created in 1800.

As a result of the reorganisation of the cantons of France which came into effect in 2015, the borders of the cantons are no longer related to the borders of the arrondissements. The cantons of the arrondissement of Agen were, as of January 2015:

 Agen-Centre
 Agen-Nord
 Agen-Nord-Est
 Agen-Ouest
 Agen-Sud-Est
 Astaffort
 Beauville
 Laplume
 Laroque-Timbaut
 Port-Sainte-Marie
 Prayssas
 Puymirol

References

Agen